Mänen Zeýnelulı (born November 1958) is a Chinese politician of Kazakh ethnicity who served as vice chairman of the Standing Committee of the People's Congress of Xinjiang Uygur Autonomous Region between 2016 and 2021, governor of Ili Kazakh Autonomous Prefecture between 2012 and 2016, and governor of Tacheng Prefecture between 2008 and 2011.

Biography
Mänen Zeýnelulı was born in Fuyun County, Xinjiang, in November 1958. He was a translator and interpreter in the Fuyun County People's Government from 1976 to 1989. He served as deputy party secretary of Kürti Township in November 1989, and five months later promoted to the party secretary position. In December 1992, he became deputy magistrate of Fuyun County, rising to magistrate in December 1997. In November 2000, he was admitted to member of the standing committee of the CPC Altay Prefecture Committee, the prefecture's top authority. He was made deputy party secretary of Tacheng Prefecture in August 2005, concurrently serving as secretary of its Commission for Discipline Inspection, the party's agency in charge of anti-corruption efforts. In February 2008, he took office as governor of Tacheng Prefecture, replacing . In February 2012, he was appointed governor of Ili Kazakh Autonomous Prefecture, succeeding Mawken Seyitqamzaüli. In January 2012, he became vice chairman of the Standing Committee of the People's Congress of Xinjiang Uygur Autonomous Region in January 2016, serving in the post until his retirement in February 2021.

He was a representative of the 18th National Congress of the Chinese Communist Party. He was a delegate to the 11th National People's Congress.

References 

1958 births
Living people
Central Party School of the Chinese Communist Party alumni
Ili Kazakh Autonomous Prefecture governors
People's Republic of China politicians from Xinjiang
Chinese Communist Party politicians from Xinjiang
Kazakhs in China
Delegates to the 11th National People's Congress